The Rock Mound Archeological Site is an archaeological site in Key Largo, Florida. It is located a half mile west of U.S. 1. On July 1, 1975, it was added to the U.S. National Register of Historic Places.

References

External links
 Monroe County listings at National Register of Historic Places
 Monroe County listings at Florida's Office of Cultural and Historical Programs

Archaeological sites in Florida
National Register of Historic Places in Monroe County, Florida
Mounds in Florida